Kévin Parsemain (born 13 February 1988) is a Martiniquais footballer who plays for Ayutthaya United and the Martinique national team, of which he is the all-time leading scorer. Besides Martinique, he has played in France, the United States, DR Congo, and Thailand.

Club career
Parsemain began his career at Club Franciscain in Martinique. For the 2006–07 season, Parsemain moved to France and signed for Le Mans FC's 'B' team after being scouted with Franciscan.   He would spend two and half season at the club.  In the winter transfer window of the 2008–09 season, he signed for the reserve team of Evian Thonon Gaillard F.C., then known as Olympique Croix de Savoie.  He made one appearance for the senior squad, playing the final 20 minutes in a 2–1 away win over Cherbourg. Parsemain's time and appearances with Olympique Croix de Savoie were cut short by a recurring groin injury. At this time, he returned to Martinique and signed with RC Rivière-Pilote in 2009.

In January 2014, it was reported by Caribbean media that Parsemain had signed with Seattle Sounders FC of Major League Soccer. It was later confirmed that Parsemain was in fact on trial with the club. During his preseason trial, Parsemain scored two goals in his first 105 minutes of action against MLS opponents, including a "stunning volley" from the top of the penalty box.  At that point in preseason, Parsemain was tied with Nigerian international Obafemi Martins as the team's leading scorer, making one of the strongest statements among unsigned players hopeful of earning a contract. Parsemain was officially signed by the Sounders on 28 March 2014.  However, only weeks after signing, he suffered a torn ACL and was expected to miss six to seven months and was not expected to appear during the 2014 Major League Soccer season. Seattle waived Parsemain in March 2015.

In August 2015, Parsemain joined five other French professional at Daring Club Motema Pembe of the Congolese Linafoot for the 2015/2016 season. He left in April 2016, stating in an interview that "You do not get paid on time, our security was not guaranteed.".

In July 2016 he returned to Martinique, signing for Golden Lion. In September 2017 an expected transfer to Sporting Kansas City was ruled out on a technicality.

International career
Parsemain made his international debut for the Martinique national team in 2008.

Career statistics
Scores and results list Martinique's goal tally first, score column indicates score after each Parsemain goal.

Honours
Individual
Martinique Championnat National top scorer: 2010–11 (with 20 goals)
Martinique Championnat National top scorer: 2021-22 (with 19 goals)

See also
 List of top international men's football goalscorers by country

References

1988 births
Living people
People from Le François
Martiniquais footballers
Martiniquais expatriate footballers
Martinique international footballers
Association football forwards
Thonon Evian Grand Genève F.C. players
Seattle Sounders FC players
Tacoma Defiance players
Golden Lion FC players
Kevin Parsemain
USL Championship players
Kevin Parsemain
Expatriate soccer players in the United States
Expatriate footballers in Thailand
French expatriate sportspeople in the United States
French expatriate sportspeople in Thailand
Martiniquais expatriate sportspeople in the United States
Martiniquais expatriate sportspeople in Thailand
2013 CONCACAF Gold Cup players
2014 Caribbean Cup players
2017 CONCACAF Gold Cup players
2019 CONCACAF Gold Cup players